Donald Harstad is an American novelist and former police officer specializing in crime fiction and police procedurals. Prior to taking up writing, he had a 26-year career with the Sheriff's Department of Clayton County, Iowa, retiring as a Deputy Sheriff. His first novel, Eleven Days, was loosely based on a case he worked on during that time, and he is known for drawing on his career in law enforcement for details of police and investigative procedure.

All of his novels are set in "Nation County", a fictional rural county in Iowa, and include many of the same characters, primarily centering on police officer Carl Houseman, a loose analog for Harstad himself. His novels have appeared in nine languages.

Harstad lives in Elkader, Iowa, with his wife of 40 years, his former high school sweetheart with whom he has one daughter. In a 2002 interview, he said that he has always been fascinated by the people mixed up in matters that come to the attention of the police, and as a novelist he is looking at how chains of bad choices lead to outcomes.

Bibliography

Novels

Carl Houseman Series 

Eleven Days (1999) Bantam 
Known Dead (2000) Bantam  
The Big Thaw (2001) Bantam 
Code 61 (2003) Bantam 
A Long December (2003) Rugged Land  
November Rain (2015) Crooked Lane Books

Other novels 

Three Octobers (2005) Rugged Land

Anthologies and collections

References

External links
 Random House: publisher's page on Harstad. Limited: it fails to list some of the books for which they produce digital media.

People from Elkader, Iowa
Writers from Los Angeles
Writers from Iowa
1945 births
Living people